Brigitte Comeau (born October 7, 1999 in Fredericton, New Brunswick) is a Canadian curler from Hanwell, New Brunswick. She is the former second on Team Justine Comeau.

Career
Brigitte Comeau has represented New Brunswick at four Canadian Junior Curling Championships with two bronze medals to her name in 2016 and 2018. She also has a very accomplished Under 18 championship record winning silver medals in both 2016 and 2017 at the 2016 U18 International Curling Championships and the 2017 Canadian U18 Curling Championships. Still of junior age, she has participated in the past few New Brunswick Scotties Tournament of Hearts. In 2017, they lost the semifinal to the Melissa Adams rink and in 2018 they lost the tiebreaker to Sarah Mallais. She did not participate in the 2019 playdowns as she was at the 2019 Canadian Junior Curling Championships. After the team lost the final of the 2019 New Brunswick U21 Championships, Comeau stepped back from competitive curling and left the team.

Personal life
Comeau currently attends the University of New Brunswick and is a Business Administration student. Her sister is Justine Comeau, a fellow curler.

Teams

Notes

References

External links

Living people
Canadian women curlers
Curlers from New Brunswick
Sportspeople from Fredericton
University of New Brunswick alumni
1999 births